David Barton (born 9 May 1959) is an English former footballer who made 159 appearances in the Football League playing as a central defender for Newcastle United, Blackburn Rovers and Darlington. He also played non-league football for Coundon TT, and represented Durham Schools at under-15 level.

References

1959 births
Living people
Sportspeople from Bishop Auckland
Footballers from County Durham
English footballers
Association football defenders
Newcastle United F.C. players
Blackburn Rovers F.C. players
Darlington F.C. players
Coundon TT F.C. players
English Football League players